

Present
Jerry Bailey (2013–present)
Donna Brothers (2000–present)
Larry Collmus (2011–present)
Britney Eurton (2018–present)
Ahmed Fareed (2019–present)
Nick Luck (2013–present)
Randy Moss (2011–present)
Eddie Olczyk (2014–present)
Kenny Rice (1999–present)
Mike Tirico (2017–present)

Past
Pete Axthelm (1984–1985)
Mike Battaglia (1993–2015)
Michelle Beadle (2012–2013)
Jill Byrne (2010)
Charlsie Cantey (2000–2005)
Marshall Cassidy (1980)
Bob Costas (1997–2018)
Trevor Denman (1988–2005)
Tom Durkin (1984–2010)
Josh Elliott (2014–2015)
Dick Enberg (1981–1990)
Bethenny Frankel (2009)
Gayle Gardner (1992)
Mary Ann Grabavoy (1994)
Tom Hammond (1984–2016)
Dave Johnson (1982–1986)
Dan Kenny (1991–1992)
Greg Lewis (1988)
Terry Leibel (1992–1993)
Rebecca Lowe (2019)
Carolyn Manno (2014–2018)
Chris McCarron (1986)
Gregg McCarron (1989–1998)
Bob Neumeier (1990–2017)
Jenny Ornsteen (1989-1992)
Harvey Pack (1984–1988)
Jessica Pacheco (2010)
Laffit Pincay III (2012–2021)
Jay Privman (2012–2017)
Jay Randolph (1984–1988)
Elfi Schlegel (1993–1999)
Brough Scott (1984–1988)
Mike E. Smith (1998)
Sharon Smith (1984–1990)
Robyn Smith (1984)
Melissa Stark (2004–2008)
Gary Stevens (2006–2012)
Jack Van Berg (1989)
John M. Veitch (1991–1997)
Krista Voda (2017)

Thoroughbred racing commentators
NBC
NBC